Antal Lyka (29 May 1908 – 1976) was a Hungarian football player and coach.

Career
Lyka played for Ferencvárosi TC in the Hungarian championshiio for over a decade, and capped 12 times for Hungary.

Lyka coached FK 14. Oktobar Niš, Ferencvárosi TC, Csepel SC, Debreceni VSC, FK Vojvodina and FK Vardar.

Honours
Ferencváros
Nemzeti Bajnokság I: 1926–27, 1931–32, 1933–34
Magyar Kupa: 1927, 1933, 1935

References

1908 births
1976 deaths
Footballers from Budapest
Hungarian footballers
Hungary international footballers
Ferencvárosi TC footballers
Hungarian football managers
Ferencvárosi TC managers
Debreceni VSC managers
FK Vojvodina managers
FK Vardar managers
Expatriate football managers in Yugoslavia
Association football midfielders
Nemzeti Bajnokság I managers